Valentin Stănescu (20 November 1922 – 4 April 1994) was a Romanian football goalkeeper and manager.

Club career
Valentin Stănescu also known as "Tinel" or "Zimbrul" (The bison) was born on 20 November 1922 in București, Romania and started playing junior level football at age 11 in 1933 at local club Olimpia. In 1942 he went to play for Malaxa Tohan for a short while, afterwards moving at Sportul Studențesc București for three years. He made his Divizia A debut playing for Carmen București under coach Petre Steinbach on 16 March 1947 in a 3–2 away victory against Dermagarand Târgu Mureș. At the end of the season, the Carmen team was dissolved by the Communist regime that just took over the country, so he and teammate Bazil Marian wanted to flee to Italy, going on a ship from the Port of Constanța but were caught by the authorities who told them that they can choose from either going to jail or play for a working-class team such as Locomotiva București and both of them chose the latter. He played for Locomotiva until he ended his career in 1952, his last season was spent in Divizia B as the club just relegated, but Stănescu stayed with the club, helping it promote back to the first division after one year. Valentin Stănescu has a total of 51 matches played in Divizia A.

International career
Valentin Stănescu played 5 matches at international level for Romania, making his debut on 22 June 1947 when coach Colea Vâlcov introduced him in the 71st minute in order to replace Stanislau Konrad in a 3–1 loss against Yugoslavia at the 1947 Balkan Cup in which he did not concede any goals. His following game, a 3–2 victory against Bulgaria was also at the 1947 Balkan Cup, a competition in which he also made his last appearance for the national team on 12 October 1947 in a 3–0 loss against Hungary.

Managerial career
Valentin Stănescu started his managerial career in 1953 at Locomotiva MCF București in the Romanian regional championship. In 1955 he went to coach at Dunărea Giurgiu, after three years moving at Unirea Focșani in Divizia B, helping it avoid relegation. In 1959 he started to coach Metalul Târgoviște, helping it promote from Divizia C to Divizia B and later to Divizia A where in his first season as coach in the first division, the team finished on the 13th place, relegating. In 1963 he went to coach Giulești based club, Rapid București where he created a team based on the clubs juniors with some transfers including his former player from Dunărea Giurgiu, Constantin Năsturescu and goalkeeper Răducanu Necula and was the first coach that implemented the 4–4–2 formation in Romanian football, thus creating a team that helped him be the first Romanian manager who wins two Balkans Cup and helped the club win the first title in its history in the 1966–67 season. In the following season he led Rapid in the 1967–68 European Cup, making his first European performance by eliminating Trakia Plovdiv with 3–2 on aggregate, being eliminated in the following round by Juventus Torino with 1–0 on aggregate, also he reached the 1968 Cupa României Final which was lost with 3–1 in extra time in front of Dinamo București that was coached by his former Carmen București teammate, Bazil Marian. He also coached Romania's Olympic team for a short while in 1964 on 17 June in a 2–1 away victory in a friendly against Yugoslavia. In 1968 he went to coach Divizia B team, Steagul Roșu Brașov, helping it win promotion to the first league after one year. In 1971 he led for a second spell Romania's Olympic team at the 1972 Summer Olympics qualifiers helping it pass Albania with 4–2 on aggregate in the first round, helping it qualify in the second round where he lost with 2–1 in the away first leg against Denmark, being replaced before the second leg. In 1971 he went to coach Steaua București, guiding it in the 1971–72 European Cup Winners' Cup campaign, being the first Romanian coach that eliminated Barcelona with 3–1 on aggregate, being eliminated after 1–1 on aggregate on the away goal rule by Bayern Munich in the quarter-finals. He became the coach of Romania's national team in 1973, making his debut in a friendly which ended with a 2–0 away loss against Soviet Union, during his two-year spell managing to earn Romania's biggest ever victory, a 9–0 against Finland at the 1974 World Cup qualifiers. Stănescu took charge of Divizia B club Petrolul Ploiești in 1976 helping it promote after one year to the first league. In 1979 he went to coach Universitatea Craiova, a team he helped win the 1979–80 Divizia A, also he became the first Romanian coach that eliminated a team from England, Leeds United with 4–0 on aggregate in the second round of the 1979–80 UEFA Cup, also earning a 1–0 victory against Borussia Mönchengladbach in the following round. In 1980 Stănescu went for a second spell at Romania's national team, earning a 2–1 home victory and a 0–0 away draw against England at the 1982 World Cup qualifiers, having a total of 35 games from his both spells at the national team consisting of 11 victories, 14 draws and 10 losses. From 1980 until 1982 he coached Dinamo București of which the first year and a half he simultaneously coached Romania, helping The Red Dogs win The Double in his second season spent at the club and managed to become the first Romanian coach that eliminated Inter Milan with 4–3 on aggregate in the second round of the 1981–82 UEFA Cup. In 1982 he returned at Rapid București, helping it get back to Divizia A after the club spent six years in Divizia B. Valentin Stănescu was the first coach that won the Romanian top-division, Divizia A with three different teams, having a total of 455 matches as a manager in the competition, consisting of 206 victories, 101 draws and 148 losses, also the Stadionul Giulești-Valentin Stănescu was named after him. Stănescu died on 4 April 1994 at age 71.

Famous speech
From all the clubs he worked for, Valentin Stănescu admitted he was mostly attached to Rapid București, holding in his spell from the 80s the following speech in front of the players which remained popular in the club over the years:"Hey guys, do you hear? Let me tell you how things are. Rapid is not yours, it is not mine or the ministry's. Rapid belongs to over 100,000 railway workers from all over the country. It belongs to them, to their wives and children, to those who were, hundreds of thousands more, and who are no longer here and of those who will be after us! They are people who have worked and are working so that you can kick a ball, learn a book, become people. Do not disgrace Rapid! Whoever doesn't love the team does not have a choice, he'll have to love it like his mother and father. Here are your mother and father, house and table and sister and brother and lover and everything, everything you want and have holy in the world! From now on I'm your grandfather, but don't think that if I'm 60 years old, I have an easier hand. Who wants can leave now, because those who stay only leave the ship with their feet first!".

Honours

Player
CFR București
Divizia B: 1952

Manager
Metalul Târgovişte
Divizia B: 1960–61
Divizia C: 1958–59
Rapid București
Divizia A: 1966–67
Cupa României runner-up: 1967–68
Balkans Cup: 1963–64, 1964–66
Divizia B: 1982–83
Steagul Roșu Brașov
Divizia B: 1968–69
Petrolul Ploiești
Divizia B: 1976–77
Universitatea Craiova
Divizia A: 1979–80
Dinamo București
Divizia A: 1981–82
Cupa României: 1981–82

Notes

References

External links

Valentin Stănescu player profile at Labtof.ro
Valentin Stănescu manager profile at Labtof.ro

1922 births
1994 deaths
Romanian footballers
Romania international footballers
Olympia București players
FC Sportul Studențesc București players
FC Carmen București players
FC Rapid București players
Romanian football managers
FC Steaua București managers
FC Dinamo București managers
FC Rapid București managers
FC Petrolul Ploiești managers
FC Brașov (1936) managers
Liga I players
Liga II players
Romania national football team managers
Association football goalkeepers